Paul Schwartz (born 1956) is an American record producer, composer, arranger, conductor, and pianist. the basic elements of which are voice, piano, violin, and electronic samples. He has collaborated with vocalists Lisbeth Scott and Rebecca Luker, performing on many songs.

Schwartz was born in New York City, the son of composer/producer Arthur Schwartz and actress/dancer Mary Schwartz, and he is the half-brother of radio personality/sometime musician Jonathan Schwartz.

Paul studied composition at the Royal College of Music in London. He has conducted the pit orchestras of Broadway shows (such as The Phantom of the Opera). He has worked with André Previn, composed and recorded with Carlos Santana and David Foster, and written for Josh Groban.

Discography

 Aria (Astor Place, 1997)
 Revolution (Astor Place, 1998)
 Aria 2: New Horizon (Astor Place, 1999)
 Aria 3: Metamorphosis (Astor Place, 2003)
 Earthbound (2002)
 State of Grace (2000, 2011)
 State of Grace II: Turning to Peace (2003)
 State of Grace III (2006)
 Glimpses of Sappho (2007)

References

External links
 Official website

1956 births
Living people
American classical pianists
American classical composers
American multi-instrumentalists
American music arrangers
American conductors (music)
Alumni of the Royal College of Music
Record producers from New York (state)